Von den Elben is the seventh studio album by the German medieval folk band Faun. It was released on 25 January 2013. Among new original content it contains a number of cover versions of old Faun tracks and songs by other artists. After signing a contract with the Universal label and the Valicon production team, Faun for the first time released an album with lyrics completely in German language. It is the first album to feature members Stephan Groth and Katja Moslehner. The album features duets with two other German bands: Santiano and Subway to Sally. Michael Boden from Subway to Sally also contributed the lyrics for tracks like "Warte auf mich" [Wait for Me].

The title track "Von den Elben" [Of the Elves] is a rework of a former Faun release from the album Licht. The previous medieval lyrics by Heinrich von Morungen were replaced by different lyrics in modern German written by Faun mastermind Oliver s. Tyr.

Reception
While Faun fans voiced their concern about the band joining a major commercial label, professional reviewers agreed that the album did not suffer from this step. The MSN reviewer called Von den Elben a "balancing act between authenticity and mass market compatibility", but wrote also that it contained several valuable tracks. The Sonic Seducer stated that fears about Faun losing their originality were baseless.

Charts
Despite the initial criticism, the album was also a commercial success. It is the first Faun album to reach top ten positions in the album charts of Germany, Austria and Switzerland, and the first album ever to chart in the latter two countries.

Nomination
With Von den Elben, Faun were nominated for the 2014 ECHO award in the categories 'National Rock/Pop Group' and 'National Newcomer of the Year'.

Track list

References

2013 albums
Faun (band) albums